The Norway women's national rugby union team are a national sporting side of Norway, representing them at rugby union. The side first played in 2003.

History

Results summary
(Full internationals only)

Results

Full internationals

Other matches

See also
 Rugby union in Norway

External links
Norges Rugbyforbund - Official Site

European national women's rugby union teams
Rugby union in Norway
Rugby union